Noel Curran (born 13 November 1965) is an Irish CEO, Chairperson and a former radio and television producer and journalist who has been the Director-General of the European Broadcasting Union since October 2017. He previously served as the Director-General of RTÉ (Ireland's national broadcaster) from 2011 to 2016. He has worked in the Editorial, Management and Commercial areas of media.

The European Broadcasting Union is the largest alliance of public service media organisations in the world. It represents 115 media companies in 56 countries. It is based in Geneva but has offices in New York, Washington, Moscow, Brussels, Singapore, Rome and Beijing. As well as representing the interests of public service media internationally the EBU provides a worldwide news service to its members, purchases international sports rights for its members, provides live classical and jazz concerts, provides a technology and innovation service, a media research unit and a range of television and radio content. The EBU also operates an independent commercial subsidiary Eurovision Services, which provides distribution and production of large sporting events around the world. Curran is Chair of Eurovision Services. He is the first Irish national to be Director General of the EBU.

Previously he was Director-General at Ireland's national broadcaster Raidió Teilifís Éireann (RTÉ). According to RTÉ's Annual Report 2015 the Director-General was responsible for 2000 staff, four TV channels, four radio stations, RTÉ Digital output, two orchestras, Ireland's transmission Network (2RN) and 334 million Euro in revenue. According to the report 155m Euro of that revenue was generated through commercial activity, which means that, as a percentage of total income, commercial income is higher at RTÉ than at most other European Public Service Media organisations.

Early life

Curran was born in Carrickmacross, County Monaghan, where he attended both primary and secondary school. He studied Communications in Dublin City University, where he specialised in Irish and International Broadcasting Policy, writing his final year thesis on the future of Public Service Broadcasting. He also wrote about European broadcasting policy while studying for post-grad.

Career

RTÉ
He joined Raidió Teilifís Éireann (RTÉ) as a business and investigative reporter in 1992, after a period working for Business & Finance magazine. While working at Business & Finance Curran was involved in several prominent investigations. He became deputy editor of Business & Finance two years after joining as a reporter, before leaving for RTÉ. He joined Current Affairs as a senior financial journalist before becoming a television producer. Curran went on to win national and international awards as a documentary producer and Editor.

He then became executive producer of live entertainment series and productions, producing several live television shows at the Point Theatre, before being appointed  as executive producer of the Eurovision Song Contest 1997, held in Dublin, presented by Ronan Keating and Carrie Crowley. He was a member of the EBU Eurovision group. His younger brother is Richard Curran, deputy editor of the Sunday Business Post and presenter of TV's Dragons Den series.

Independent work
Curran left RTÉ in 2000 to become a director of a private independent production company. As an independent, he won an IFTA award as executive producer of the investigative documentary Bad Blood'.

Senior management at RTÉ
He returned to RTÉ as Editor of Current Affairs, where he helped launch the Prime Time Investigates series of documentaries. He was editor of the award winning Mary Raftery documentaries Cardinal Secrets and Broken Trust. He spoke on Radio 1's 'Drivetime' programme about Mary Raftery's contribution to journalism after her death in January 2012.

In 2003, he was appointed managing director of TV, at 37 the youngest person to hold the position, according to the Irish Independent and Irish Times. He led a policy of increased investment in Irish TV production during his tenure, as RTÉ's commercial income grew to its highest historic level. According to the Sunday Business Post'' Curran's tenure marked the first time editorial and commercial departments in TV were integrated under one managing director.

Director General of RTÉ
In March 2010, Curran left RTÉ to pursue a consultancy and other private business interests before being interviewed and then appointed DG by the RTÉ board effective from 1 February 2011. 

In 2017 he was appointed Director General of the EBU.

He returned to Dublin City University in April 2016, where he criticised Irish broadcasting policy and warned that RTÉ and public media faced a difficult financial future without changes in policy and funding.

Personal life
Curran is married to musician Eimear Quinn, winner of the Eurovision Song Contest 1996. They have two daughters: Joelene born in October 2009 and Marlene born in April 2012. They divide their time between Ireland and Switzerland.

References 

1967 births
Living people
Alumni of Dublin City University
Directors-General of RTÉ
Irish radio producers
Irish television producers
The Late Late Show (Irish talk show)
People from County Monaghan